Duke Nukem II is a 1993 platform game developed  and published by Apogee Software. The game consists of four episodes (of eight levels each), the first available as shareware. It is the follow-up to 1991's Duke Nukem, and followed by Duke Nukem 3D in 1996. Todd Replogle was the primary designer of all three games.

A heavily reworked version of Duke Nukem II, simply titled Duke Nukem, was released for the Game Boy Color on September 10, 1999 in North America.

Gameplay

The player's goal is to proceed through the levels collecting items, destroying enemies to the level exit and at the final level, defeat the super alien boss. In one level of each episode Duke needs to destroy radar dishes to progress.

Duke Nukem can pick up weapons along the way. There are four types of weapons: His regular default gun, the flamethrower (which can shoot through walls and launch him in the air), the laser (which can shoot through anything) and the rocket launcher. Duke can also get a rapid fire powerup. Health items can be collected to heal damage Duke receives or to boost score points at full health. Keycards need to be collected to access past the force fields and keys must be obtained to get past locked doors. A cloaking device makes Duke temporarily invincible and disables the super force fields.

Movement through the levels mainly consists of jumping onto platforms, climbing ladders, operating elevators, using teleporters, hovering over blowing fans and climbing hand-over-hand across pipes or girders. At the end of every level (with the exception of the last level in each episode), the player can receive up to seven 100,000 point bonuses, earned by making certain achievements in the level, such as destroying all cameras.

Plot
In 1998, the evil Rigelatins plan to enslave Earth, and they kidnap Duke Nukem during the Oprah Winfrey Show in city Neo LA (in GBC Nerola City), to use his brain to plot the attack for their forces. Duke escapes from the cell and fights across the planet's surface and underground, where he first wants to destroy the city's energy reactor and then capture the fighter jet to return to Earth.

Development
The game uses VGA and EGA graphics and draws two backgrounds ("dual-parallax scrolling"). The game took almost two years to create.

Reception
Allgame gave Duke Nukem II 3 out of 5 stars for the original DOS version, and 4 out of 5 for the Game Boy Color version.

PC Zone gave the game 4 out of 5 stars.

References

External links
Duke Nukem II website

1993 video games
Apogee games
DOS games
Duke Nukem
Fiction set around Rigel
Game Boy Color games
Games commercially released with DOSBox
GT Interactive games
IOS games
Linux games
MacOS games
Platform games
Science fiction video games
Side-scrolling platform games
Single-player video games
Slipgate Ironworks games
Torus Games games
Video games developed in the United States
Video games scored by Bobby Prince
Windows games